The Lionel Gelber Prize is a literary award for English non-fiction books on foreign policy. Founded in 1989 by Canadian diplomat Lionel Gelber, the prize awards "the world’s best non-fiction book in English on foreign affairs that seeks to deepen public debate on significant international issues." The award is presented annually by the Munk School of Global Affairs and Public Policy at the University of Toronto.
 
Recipients are judged by an international jury panel of experts. The award has been described by The Economist as "the world's most important award for non-fiction". Past winners have included Lawrence Wright, Jonathan Spence, David McCullough, Kanan Makiya, Michael Ignatieff, Eric Hobsbawm, Robert Kinloch Massie, Adam Hochschild (two time winner), Robert Skidelsky, Baron Skidelsky, Walter Russell Mead, Chrystia Freeland, and Steve Coll.

List of award winners
 1990: The Search for Modern China by Jonathan D. Spence.
 1991: Code of Peace: Ethics and Security in the World of Warlord States by Dorothy V. Jones.
 1992: Truman by David McCullough.
 1993: Cruelty and Silence: War, Tyranny, Uprising and the Arab World by Kanan Makiya.
 1994: Blood and Belonging: Journeys Into the New Nationalism by Michael Ignatieff.
 1995: Age of Extremes: The Short 20th Century by Eric Hobsbawm.
 1996: Inside the Kremlin's Cold War: From Stalin to Khrushchev by Vladislav Zubok and Constantine Pleshakov
 1997: Aftermath: The Remnants of War by Donovan Webster.
 1998: Loosing the Bonds: The United States and South Africa In the Apartheid Years by Robert Kinloch Massie.
 1999: King Leopold's Ghost: A Story of Greed, Terror and Heroism In Colonial Africa by Adam Hochschild.
 2000: A Great Wall: Six Presidents and China: An Investigative History by Patrick Tyler.
 2001: John Maynard Keynes, Fighting for Britain 1937-1946 by Lord Robert Skidelsky.
 2002: Special Providence: American Foreign Policy and How It Changed the World by Walter Russell Mead.
 2003: America Unbound: The Bush Revolution in Foreign Policy by Ivo H. Daalder and James M. Lindsay
 2004: Ghost Wars: The Secret History of the CIA, Afghanistan, and Bin Laden, from the Soviet Invasion to September 10, 2001 by Steve Coll.
 2006: Bury the Chains: Prophets and Rebels in the Fight to Free an Empire's Slaves by Adam Hochschild.
 2007: The Looming Tower: Al Qaeda and the Road to 9/11 by Lawrence Wright.
 2008: The Bottom Billion: Why the Poorest Countries are Failing and What Can Be Done About It by Paul Collier.
 2009: A Choice of Enemies: America Confronts the Middle East by Sir Lawrence Freedman.
 2010: The Generalissimo: Chiang Kai-shek and the Struggle for Modern China by Jay Taylor.
 2011: Polar Imperative:  A History of Arctic Sovereignty in North America by Shelagh Grant.
 2012: Deng Xiaoping and the Transformation of China by Ezra Vogel.
 2013: Plutocrats: The Rise of the New Global Super-Rich and the Fall of Everyone Else by Chrystia Freeland.
 2014: The Blood Telegram: Nixon, Kissinger, and a Forgotten Genocide by Gary J. Bass.
 2015: The Last Empire: The Final Days of the Soviet Union by Serhii Plokhy
 2016: Objective Troy: A Terrorist, A President, and the Rise of the Drone by Scott Shane
 2017: A Rage for Order: The Middle East in Turmoil, from Tahrir Square to ISIS by Robert F. Worth published by Farrar, Straus and Giroux
 2018: Red Famine: Stalin's War on Ukraine by Anne Applebaum published by Penguin Random House
 2019: Crashed: How a Decade of Financial Crises Changed the World by Adam Tooze published by Penguin Random House
 2020: The Light that Failed: A Reckoning by Ivan Krastev and Stephen Holmes
 2021: Trade Wars Are Class Wars: How Rising Inequality Distorts the Global Economy and Threatens International Peace by Matthew C. Klein and Michael Pettis
 2022:  The American War in Afghanistan: A History by Carter Malkasian

References

External links
Gelber Prize - Munk School of Global Affairs
The Lionel Gelber Prize on Twitter

Canadian non-fiction literary awards
Political book awards
Awards established in 1989
1989 establishments in Canada